Greenwich station is a commuter rail stop on the Metro-North Railroad's New Haven Line in Greenwich, Connecticut. It is also the first/last stop for some express trains that originate/terminate at South Norwalk, Bridgeport, New Haven–Union Station or New Haven–State Street.

History
The Penn Central Transportation Company opened the current station building on March 5, 1970, replacing an older structure, built by the New York & New Haven Railroad, which was demolished. The station was the centerpiece of Greenwich Plaza, a new mixed-use retail development. A proposed $45 million project, of which plans were shown in July 2019, would replace that building with a new station on the south side of the tracks.

Station layout

The station has two high-level side platforms, each 10 cars long.

Unlike most station on the line, Greenwich station is owned and maintained by multiple agencies and organizations. The State of Connecticut owns the station's platforms, Metro-North maintains the platforms, but the station building and parking facilities are privately owned.

As of August 2006, weekday commuter ridership was 2,804, and there are 1,274 parking spots (none owned by the state, unlike most other railroad stations in Connecticut).

Bibliography

References

External links

http://www.ct.gov/dot/lib/dot/documents/dpt/1_Station_Inspection_Summary_Report.pdf

Metro-North Railroad stations in Connecticut
Stations on the Northeast Corridor
Stations along New York, New Haven and Hartford Railroad lines
Railroad stations in Fairfield County, Connecticut
Buildings and structures in Greenwich, Connecticut
Railway stations in the United States opened in 1848